List of Hong Kong national rugby union players is a list of people who have played for the Hong Kong national rugby union team. The list only includes players who have played in a Test match.

Note that the "position" column lists the position at which the player made his Test debut, not necessarily the position for which he is best known. A position in parentheses indicates that the player debuted as a substitute.

References

Hong Kong
Rugby union players